Casaubon  is a surname. Notable people with the surname include:

Isaac Casaubon (1559–1614), French classical scholar
Méric Casaubon (1599–1671), French-English classical scholar, son of Isaac
Marcelo Ebrard Casaubón (born 1959), head of government of the Mexican Federal District

Fictional characters:
Edward Casaubon, character in Middlemarch, 1871–72 novel by George Eliot
Casaubon (no first name given), character in Foucault's Pendulum, 1988 novel by Umberto Eco
Casaubon, the name of a character in several of Mary Gentle's works